Horsey may refer to:

 Horse, in baby-talk

Places
The name comes from Anglo-Saxon "hors-eg" and means horse-island.
 Horsey, Norfolk, England
 Horsey, Ontario, Canada
 Horsey, Somerset, England
 Horsey, Virginia, United States
 Horsey Down, near Lechlade
 Horsey Island, near Walton-on-the-Naze in Essex, England
 Horsey Island, Devon, a nature reserve near Braunton, England; see Braunton Canal
 Horsey Mere, one of the Norfolk Broads in the east of England

People
 David Horsey (born 1951), American editorial cartoonist
 David Horsey (golfer) (born 1985), English professional golfer
 Edward Horsey (1525–1583), conspirator against Queen Mary I of England
 Henry R. Horsey (1924–2016), American jurist
 Jerome Horsey (c. 1550–1626), English explorer, diplomat and politician
 John Horsey (died 1546) (1489–1546), knight of Henry VIII of England
 John Horsey (died 1564) (1510–1564/65), knight of Henry VIII, son of above
 Michael Horsey (born 1949), American politician from Philadelphia
 Outerbridge Horsey (1777–1842), lawyer and U.S. Senator from Delaware
 Christopher Horsey (born 1972), Australian entertainer

Other uses 
 Horsey (album), album by Current 93
 Horsey (band), an English rock band from London
 Horsey (film), a 1997 Canadian independent film

See also
 Justice Horsey (disambiguation)